This is a list of the number-one downloaded songs in Canada during the year 2020.

The Nielsen SoundScan-compiled chart is published on Music Canada's website on Mondays and Billboard on Tuesdays.

Chart history

See also
List of Canadian Hot 100 number-one singles of 2020
List of number-one albums of 2020 (Canada)
List of number-one digital songs of 2019 (Canada)

References

External links
Billboard Hot Canadian Digital Songs
Current Hot Digital Canadian Songs

Canada Digital Songs
Digital 2020
2020 in Canadian music